A total of 21 teams were invited to participate in the 1994 Tour de France. Fifteen teams were announced in May, based on their UCI ranking:

The Jolly-team of Zenon Jaskuła, who had finished in third place in the 1993 Tour de France, was not selected. Each team sent a squad of nine riders, so the Tour began with a peloton of 189 cyclists. Out of the 189 riders that started this edition of the Tour de France, a total of 117 riders made it to the finish in Paris.

Teams

Qualified teams

Invited teams

Cyclists

By starting number

By team

By nationality
The 189 riders that competed in the 1994 Tour de France represented 25 different countries. Riders from ten countries won stages during the race; French and Italian riders won the largest number of stages.

Notes

References

1994 Tour de France
1994